Paccius is a genus of African araneomorph spiders first described by Eugène Simon in 1898 as a member of Corinnidae, and moved to Trachelidae in 2014.

Species
 it contains eight species from Madagascar and Seychelles:
Paccius angulatus Platnick, 2000 — Madagascar
Paccius elevatus Platnick, 2000 — Madagascar
Paccius griswoldi Platnick, 2000 — Madagascar
Paccius madagascariensis (Simon, 1889) — Madagascar
Paccius mucronatus Simon, 1898 — Madagascar
Paccius quadridentatus Simon, 1898 — Seychelles
Paccius quinteri Platnick, 2000 — Madagascar
Paccius scharffi Platnick, 2000 — Madagascar

References

External links

Araneomorphae genera
Trachelidae